A dharamshala, also written as dharmashala is a public resthouse or shelter in the Indian subcontinent. Just as sarai are for travellers and caravans, dharamshalas are built for religious travellers at pilgrimage sites. In Nepal there are dharamshalas especially built for pilgrims as well as dharamshalas for locals.

Etymology
Dharamshala (Devanagari: धर्मशाला; ITRANS: Dharmashaalaa; IAST: Dharmaśālā) is a word (derived from Sanskrit) that is a compound of dharma (धर्म) and shālā (शाला). A loose translation into English would be 'spiritual dwelling' or, more loosely, 'sanctuary'. Rendering a precise literal translation into English is problematic due to the vast and conceptually rich semantic field of the word dharma, and the cultural aspect of India.

In common Hindu usage, the word dharamshala refers to a shelter or rest house for spiritual pilgrims. Traditionally, such dharamshalas (pilgrims' rest houses) were commonly constructed near pilgrimage destinations (which were often located in remote areas) to give visitors a place to sleep for the night.

Transcription and pronunciation
Due to a lack of uniform observance of transliteration and transcription conventions for Hindi (and the Devanagari script in which Hindi is written), the name of the town has been transcribed into English (and other languages using Romanic scripts) variously as Dharamshala, Dharamsala and, less frequently, Dharmshala and Dharmsala. These four permutations result from two variables: the transcription of the word धर्म (dharma)—particularly the second syllable (र्म)—and that of the third syllable (शा).

A strict transliteration of धर्म as written would be 'dharma' . Thus, if the goal of the transcription is phonetic accord with modern spoken Hindi, then 'dharam' and 'dharm' are both legitimate options.

Regarding the third syllable, the Devanagari श corresponds to the English sh sound, . Thus शाला is transcribed in English as 'shala'.

Therefore, the most accurate phonetic transcription of the Hindi धर्मशाला into Roman script for common (non-technical) English usage is either 'Dharamshala' or, less commonly, 'Dharmshala', both of which render the sh sound of श in English as 'sh' to convey the correct native pronunciation, 'Dharamshala'  or 'Dharmshala' . Nonetheless, the alternate spelling 'Dharamsala' continues to be used in some cases despite its inaccuracy, and all four spelling permutations can be found in the English language materials of the local and state governments, in publications, and on the Internet.

Regardless of spelling variations, however, it is that the correct native pronunciation is with the sh sound. Therefore, the spelling variant that is most common and most concordant with standards of transcription and native pronunciation is 'Dharamshala'. The official Indian English spelling is 'Dharamshala'.
It is both written and pronounced as Dharmaśālā in Nepali.

Community-specific dharamshala
Sometimes a dharmaśālā is built at religious pilgrimages for a specific community, caste, ethnic group, profession or persons from a specific region. The specified pilgrims are generally charged minimal or allowed free stay for a limited duration at a Dharamshala specifically built for them but other pilgrims may be charged higher amounts.

Nepalese dharmashalas
In Nepal dharmashalas can be found in every village and city. More often than not they have a social and cultural significance rather than a religious one.

Usually there is a source of drinking water (a well, a dhunge dhara or a tutedhara) nearby.

There are three different types of dharmashala: a pati, a sattal and a mandapa.

Patis
Patis or palchas are the simplest of the three types. They consist of a platform made of stone and brick, with wooden floorboards. Wooden pillars support a sloping roof. The back of the pati is a brick wall. The other sides are usually open. Patis can be either free standing of connected to another building, like a house or a dhunge dhara. Patis can be rectangular, L-shaped, T-shaped, U-shaped, curved or circular. The rectangular shape and the L shape are the most common. Patis are the smallest of the dharmashalas but some can be up to 32 bays long. Patis are found within cities and villages, but also on the side of the road, often near a source of water.

In Patan fourteen patis house parts of the chariot used for the Rato Machindranath Jatra. Preparations for the festival begin with the construction of a 60-foot tall chariot at Pulchok at the western end of the city.

Sattals
Sattals have one or two extra, usually closed, storeys on top of a pati-like structure. The ground floor is mostly open on three sides. Sattals are resting places, not just for the day, but also for overnight stays.

Mandapas
Mandapas are square, freestanding buildings, much like patis, but they are open on all sides. The simplest mandapa is a platform with a roof, which rests on sixteen wooden pillars. Two of such mandapas can be found on either side of the entrance stairs of Manga Hiti in Patan. Mandapas can also have multiple storeys, like the Kasthamandap in Kathmandu and the Chyasilin Mandap in Bhaktapur.

Chyasilin Mandap was built in the eighteenth century, but completely destroyed during the 1934 earthquake. Architects Götz Hagmüller and Niels Gutschow rebuilt it, using old paintings and early twentieth century photographs as a reference. With the help of locals who had survived the 1934 earthquake, they managed to locate eight of the original pillars and some other fragments of the old building. Dr. Walther Mann, an expert on earthquake proof architecture, created an internal framework of steel and concrete. Craftsmen from Bhaktapur and Patan recreated all the other parts. The work was completed in 1990. Thanks to the controversial choice to use contemporary technology to strengthen the structure, Chyasilin Mandap survived the 2015 earthquakes without damage.

During the past century many dharmashalas have been converted into shops, restaurants and other private spaces.

See also

 Dak bungalow, the resthouses of the British Raj
 Kasthamandap
 Singha Sattal

References

Hindi words and phrases
Hindu temple architecture

Architecture in Nepal